Traveller Supplement 12: Forms and Charts is a 1983 role-playing game supplement for Traveller published by Game Designers' Workshop. Forms and Charts is a compilation of all the various forms and charts that had been appearing in different places as handouts from GDW – at conventions, on the mailing wrapper for the Journal of the Travellers' Aid Society, and portions of some adventures. Thirteen Traveller supplements were published. A single collected volume was published by Far Future Enterprises in 2000.

Reception
Frederick Paul Kiesche III reviewed Forms and Charts in The Space Gamer No. 66. Kiesche commented that "I found Forms and Charts to be a well thought-out and prepared Traveller supplement.  I especially like the out-front permission to photocopy to our heart's content.  This supplement, when carefully used, will add a lot to a referee's Traveller campaign."

Andy Slack reviewed Supplement 12: Forms and Charts for White Dwarf #49, giving it an overall rating of 2 out of 10, and stated that "One of the strong points of Traveller is that the game mechanics are simple enough that complex record sheets are unnecessary, and I for one will stick to my 3" x 5" cards and graph paper. Supplement 12 is pure chrome."

Reviews
 Different Worlds #35 (July/Aug., 1984)

See also
 Classic Traveller Supplements

References

Role-playing game supplements introduced in 1983
Traveller (role-playing game) supplements